Lawrence A. Conner, Sr. (August 22, 1899 – May 21, 1964) was an American politician from Pennsylvania who served as a Democratic member of the Pennsylvania House of Representatives for Delaware County from 1953 to 1954.

Early life and education
Conner was born in Chester, Pennsylvania and attended parochial school and business college.

Career
Conner served as Chief Clerk and Chief Deputy United States Marshal for the eastern district of Pennsylvania and as Chief Fire Examiner for the Pennsylvania Insurance Department.

Conner served as chair of the Chester City Democratic Committee.  He was elected to the Pennsylvania House of Representatives for Delaware County and served from 1953 to 1954.  He had an unsuccessful campaign for reelection to the House in 1954 and 1960.

He had unsuccessful campaigns for mayor of Chester and for city councilman.  He served as Democratic leader for the 7th Ward.

Conner died in Lima, Pennsylvania and is interred at St. Thomas the Apostle Church Cemetery in Glen Mills, Pennsylvania.

References

External links
 

1899 births
1964 deaths
20th-century American politicians
Burials in Pennsylvania
Democratic Party members of the Pennsylvania House of Representatives
People from Chester, Pennsylvania
United States Marshals